Titkanlu Rural District is a rural district (dehestan) in Khabushan District, Faruj County, North Khorasan Province, Iran. At the 2006 census, its population was 9,858, in 2,658 families.  The rural district has 12 villages.

References 

Rural Districts of North Khorasan Province
Faruj County